The Boondock Saints is a 1999 American vigilante action thriller film written and directed by Troy Duffy. The film stars Sean Patrick Flanery and Norman Reedus as fraternal twin brothers Connor and Murphy MacManus, who become vigilantes after killing two members of the Russian Mafia in self-defense. After both experience an epiphany, the twins, together with their friend "Funny Man" Rocco (David Della Rocco), set out to rid their home city of Boston of crime and evil, all the while being pursued by FBI special agent Paul Smecker (Willem Dafoe).

Duffy indicates that the screenplay was inspired by personal experience while living in Los Angeles. Initially regarded as one of the hottest scripts in Hollywood, the movie had a troubled production. Miramax Films dropped the project in 1997 before Franchise Pictures picked it up the following year. The film was finally given a limited theatrical release of only five theaters for one week due to movie-studio politics and worries about association with the 1999 Columbine High School massacre. It was met with poor critical reviews; however, the film ultimately grossed about $50 million in domestic video sales and developed a large cult following. The movie was followed by a 2009 sequel, The Boondock Saints II: All Saints Day.

Plot

In Boston, two Irish American fraternal twin brothers, Connor and Murphy MacManus (Sean Patrick Flanery and Norman Reedus), attend Mass, where the priest mentions the fate of Kitty Genovese. Later, when Connor and Murphy are celebrating Saint Patrick's Day with friends, three Russian mobsters arrive and announce they want to close the pub and take over the land it is built on. A brawl ensues, in which the Russians are defeated and humiliated. The next morning, when two of the Russians seek revenge on Connor and Murphy, the mobsters are killed in self-defense.

FBI agent Paul Smecker (Willem Dafoe) is assigned to the case, and finds that the police and local news reporters see the MacManus twins as heroes. The duo turn themselves in at a police station, where Smecker interviews them. After the twins retell their incident to Smecker, he declines to press charges and allows them to spend the night in a holding cell to avoid attention from the media. That night, they receive a "calling" from God telling them to hunt down wicked men so that the innocent will flourish.

Connor and Murphy resolve to rid Boston of evil men. Connor learns of a meeting of Russian syndicate bosses at a hotel. Having equipped themselves with weaponry from a local underground gun dealer, the twins kill all nine Russian mobsters, while Rocco, a friend of the twins and errand boy for local mafia boss Giuseppe "Papa Joe" Yakavetta (Carlo Rota), is sent on a hit as an unknowing pawn. The next day, learning that he was betrayed, having been sent to kill nine Russian mobsters with only a six-shooter revolver, Rocco agrees to help Connor and Murphy. That night, they hunt down and kill Vincenzo Lapazzi (Ron Jeremy), an underboss of the Yakavetta crime family.

Concerned he may be a target, Papa Joe contacts a hitman, Il Duce (Billy Connolly), to deal with them. After killing a criminal that Rocco had a personal hatred for, the three men are ambushed by Il Duce. Although they manage to chase Il Duce away, the three men suffer serious wounds, including the loss of Rocco's finger. The three return to a safehouse where they treat their wounds.

Hours later as the police conduct an investigation at the crime scene, the investigation seems futile since the twins covered their tracks by spraying any blood left behind with ammonia. However, Smecker happens upon the part of the finger lost by Rocco and decides to do an independent investigation to see who was behind the gun battle. Smecker is able to track the evidence down to Rocco and his two allies. This leaves Smecker in a difficult scenario, and struggles with the choice of whether to prosecute the three men, or join them in their cause, as Smecker believes they are doing the right thing. After getting drunk at a gay bar and subsequently getting advice from a reluctant priest, Smecker decides to help the trio.

Later, the twins and Rocco inform Smecker that they plan to infiltrate the Yakavetta headquarters to finish off the family, but Smecker learns they are walking into a trap. The twins are captured, and Rocco is shot and killed by Papa Joe, but the twins are able to free themselves. As Papa Joe leaves his house, Smecker arrives in drag and kills a number of soldiers before being knocked unconscious by Il Duce. As the twins say their family prayer over Rocco, Il Duce enters the room and prepares to open fire. However, he instead finishes the prayer – revealing he is the twins' father and decides to join his sons in their mission.

Three months later, Papa Joe is sent to trial for a third time. However, the reporters on-scene anticipate his acquittal. The twins and Il Duce, aided by Smecker, Dolly, Duffy and Greenly, infiltrate the trial after sliding their weapons over the metal detector. Unmasked, they make a speech stating that they intend to eradicate evil wherever they find it before reciting their family prayer and killing Papa Joe. The media dubs the three as "the Saints".

Cast

 Willem Dafoe as Paul Smecker, a brilliant but emotionally troubled FBI special agent assigned to the murders linked to the MacManus twins.
 Sean Patrick Flanery as Connor MacManus, one-half of the MacManus twins. He has a tattoo on his left hand that reads "Veritas" ("truth" in Latin). He is more sensible and rational than his brother, and often tries to carefully plan out their missions; however, he usually and foolishly bases his plans on plans used by classic action movies. Connor frequently references John Wayne, Clint Eastwood, and Charles Bronson.
 Norman Reedus as Murphy MacManus, the other half of the MacManus twins. He has a tattoo on his right hand that reads "Aequitas" ("justice/equality" in Latin). He seems to be the more emotional and hot-headed of the two; however, Murphy is usually shown to be exasperated by Connor's second-hand cliche movie plans.
 David Della Rocco as David 'The Funny Man' Della Rocco, a henchman of the Yakavetta clan until Papa Joe sets him up to be killed, and a loyal friend of the MacManus twins.
 Billy Connolly as Noah 'Il Duce' MacManus, the father of Connor and Murphy. He is released from prison by Yakavetta to confront the twins and Rocco, only to assist the twins after learning who they are.
 Bob Marley as Detective David Greenly, a marginally competent Boston Police Department detective assigned to the gang murders.
 David Ferry as Detective 'Dolly' Alapopskalius, a detective partnered with Greenly and Duffy.
 Brian Mahoney as Detective Duffy, a detective partnered with Greenly and Dolly.
 Richard Fitzpatrick as The Chief, Boston Police Department Chief.
 Carlo Rota as Giuseppe 'Papa Joe' Yakavetta, a leader of a powerful mafia in Boston.
 Ron Jeremy as Vincenzo Lapazzi, Yakavetta's right-hand man.
 Carmen DiStefano as Augustus Distephano, a retired mobster who helps Papa Joe get Il Duce out of prison.
 Gerard Parkes as 'Doc' McGinty, the owner of an Irish-themed pub who has Tourette syndrome with coprolalia.
 Tom Barnett as Irish Gun Dealer, he supplies the Saints with guns.
 Lauren Piech as Donna, Rocco's junkie girlfriend.
 Gina Sorell as Rayvie, Donna's junkie friend.
 Dick Callahan as Sal, restaurant owner who is mob connected to Papa Joe.
 Angelo Tucci as Vinnie, head of Rocco's crew in the deli who knew about Rocco's set-up.
 Sergio Di Zio as Oly, one of the men in the deli who knew about Rocco's set-up.
 Layton Morrison as Vladdy, a Russian Mafia soldier.
 Scott Griffith as Ivan Checkov, a Russian Mafia soldier.
 Viktor Pedtchenko as Yuri Petrov, a Russian Mafia boss.
 Troy Duffy as Man In Bar On St. Patrick's Day.

Production
Duffy's screenplay was inspired by his disgust at seeing a drug dealer taking money from a corpse across the hall from his apartment. Duffy, who was working as a bartender and bouncer, had never written a screenplay before.

Duffy completed the screenplay in fall of 1996 and passed it to a producer's assistant at New Line Cinema to be read by a senior executive. The screenplay changed hands through multiple studios and Duffy was approached by multiple producers for the rights. In March 1997, he was contracted by Paramount Pictures for $500,000, and later in the month, Miramax Films won a bidding war to buy The Boondock Saints. The studio offered $450,000 to Duffy to write and direct the film. The documentary Overnight, which chronicled Duffy's "rags-to-riches-to-rags" story, showed that the script was worth $300,000, and the film itself was originally given a $15 million budget by Miramax's Harvey Weinstein. Duffy's band The Brood would do the soundtrack, and as a bonus, Miramax offered to buy and throw in co-ownership of J. Sloan's, where Duffy worked. Overnight showed that Duffy frequently exhibited abrasive behavior, causing tension for many people involved in the project. Filming of The Boondock Saints was scheduled for the coming autumn in Boston.

Casting and funding
Duffy sought to cast Stephen Dorff and Mark Wahlberg as the brothers, though Wahlberg passed for Boogie Nights. The director also wanted to cast Billy Connolly and Kenneth Branagh in the film, with Branagh playing FBI Agent Paul Smecker. Duffy also expressed interest in casting Brendan Fraser, Nicky Katt, and Ewan McGregor, with two of them as the brothers, but no decisions were finalized. The director later sought Patrick Swayze to play Smecker, but Miramax preferred Sylvester Stallone (with whom the studio had an existing relationship), Bill Murray, or Mike Myers. Kevin Spacey and Robert De Niro were also considered for the role of Smecker. Before pre-production work was supposed to begin in Boston in December 1997, Miramax pulled out of the project. Producer Lloyd Segan said that the project had stalled because of casting and location problems. While Duffy was able to keep the writer's fee of $300,000, the studio required the reimbursement of the $150,000 director's fee and the $700,000 advance to develop the project.

The independent studio Franchise Pictures sought to finance the project once other elements were in place. Duffy approached Sean Patrick Flanery and Norman Reedus to play the brothers, and Willem Dafoe to play the FBI agent. Having found someone to back the film, filming began in Toronto, with the final scenes being filmed in Boston. The name of Duffy's band, The Brood, was changed to The Boondock Saints, following the movie's release. The film featured two songs from the band: "Holy Fool", which played during Rocco's tavern shootout, and "Pipes", which played during the credits.

Release
The Boondock Saints had a very limited theatrical release through Indican Pictures showing the film in 2000 on only five screens in the United States for several weeks. However, the original unrated version of the film was later re-released in theaters on May 22, 2006. Duffy later funded screenings of the film with help from Blockbuster Video. "Indican Pictures and Blockbuster saved us [...] They agreed to take it on exclusively, and from there the rest is history." According to Troy Duffy on his audio commentary of the film on DVD, the film's distributor allowed the limited screening in the United States because of the then-recent Columbine High School massacre and the pending Blockbuster exclusive. The film was shown on major foreign screens (most notably in Japan) with success. Blockbuster released The Boondock Saints as a "Blockbuster Exclusive", a collection of independent direct-to-video films. The Boondock Saints gained a following mostly due to word-of-mouth publicity and was a bestseller when released on DVD. Despite its success, Troy Duffy and Indican Pictures never saw any of the profits from DVD distribution, having signed away the DVD rights to 20th Century Fox as part of the settlement with Franchise Pictures. According to Duffy, neither he, his producers, nor his principal cast got paid. He sued Franchise Pictures and other undisclosed companies for royalties of the first film and rights to the sequel. After a lengthy lawsuit, Troy Duffy, his producers, and the principal cast received an undisclosed amount of The Boondock Saints royalties, as well as the sequel rights.

Home media 
The Boondock Saints has been released numerous times on DVD, including an import on March 13, 2001, and an uncut Japanese release published by Toshiba Entertainment, whose special features include anamorphic widescreen, audio commentary, trailers, and interviews with the Japanese media. On May 23, 2006, The Boondock Saints Collector's Edition was published and released by 20th Century Fox on DVD, as well as UMD for the PlayStation Portable. The special features include English and Spanish subtitles, commentary by Billy Connolly and Troy Duffy, deleted scenes, and outtakes. It also featured the film's trailer, cast and crew filmographies, and a printable script of the film. 20th Century Fox and Duffy showed an interest in doing a new audio commentary for the special release, but he was unable to because of unresolved legal issues.

Reception
On the review aggregator website Rotten Tomatoes the film has a score of 27% based on 30 reviews, with an average rating of 4.7/10. The site's consensus calls the film, "A juvenile, ugly movie that represents the worst tendencies of directors channeling Tarantino." On Metacritic, the film has a weighted average score of 44 out of 100, based on 4 critics, indicating "mixed or average reviews".

Nathan Rabin of The A.V. Club described the film, in his review of the DVD, as "less a proper action-thriller" than "a series of gratuitously violent setpieces strung together with only the sketchiest semblance of a plot". Rabin went on to describe the film as "all style and no substance, a film so gleeful in its endorsement of vigilante justice that it almost veers (or ascends) into self-parody." Robert Koehler of Variety wrote in his review: "A belated entry in the hipster crime movie movement that began with Reservoir Dogs, Troy Duffy's Boondock Saints mixes blood and Catholic-tinged vigilante justice in excessive portions for sometimes wacky and always brutal effect. [The film is] more interested in finding fresh ways to stage execution scenes than in finding meaning behind the human urge for self-appointed righting of wrongs."

Koehler also described Flanery and Reedus as "curiously stolid and blank", while praising supporting actors Connolly, Dafoe, and Rota for making the most of their screen time. Koehler also praised the tech personnel: "This uneven exercise in pacing and cutting is abetted by an eclectic score by Jeff Danna and whiz lensing by Adam Kane. Other tech credits fire bull's-eyes."

Film critics have taken note of the film's extreme violence and "slow-motion bloodletting".

Box office
In its original run, the film only earned $30,471 at five theaters. It later developed a cult following and has grossed about $50 million in domestic video sales.

Documentary

The documentary film Overnight was released in 2003, following the story of Troy Duffy during his negotiations with Miramax over The Boondock Saints script, as well as his band's struggles to secure a recording contract. Duffy's abrasive behavior strained his relationships with friends and people in the film industry and ultimately led to Miramax pulling out of the project, leaving the film to be made by another studio at half the originally proposed budget.

Sequels

After numerous delays, Troy Duffy shot a sequel, The Boondock Saints II: All Saints Day, in which the MacManus twins return to Boston in order to continue their reign of vengeance. It was released October 30, 2009.

In an October 27, 2009, article, director Duffy and actor Connolly mention details regarding a possible third film. They maintained that "it is slowly in the works and is still just an idea". Duffy insists that he wants to get a few more of his films done before returning to the Boondock Saints. Duffy also added that the proposed working title for the third film would be called "Boondock Saints III: Saints Preserve Us".

Again, on February 26, 2013, Duffy stated that he was getting together with Reedus and Flanery to resume talks about The Boondock Saints 3, in hopes that they could make the film a reality for fans.

As of July 2013, Duffy has confirmed in an interview that he is working on the script for the third film, and possibly a TV series, later named as The Boondock Saints: Origins.

On September 3, 2014, the third film, subtitled Legion, was revealed to be in pre-production.

In 2017, Flanery tweeted that he and Reedus had walked away from The Boondock Saints 3. While he did not elaborate on much, he suggested that the "unethical" production of the project caused their departure.

In November 2021, a third Boondock Saints film was officially announced with production slated to begin in May 2022. Sean Patrick Flanery and Norman Reedus will reprise their roles as Connor and Murphy MacManus and Troy Duffy will return to direct the third film.

Comic book 
A two-part comic-book story, serving as a companion to the movie sequel, was released in May 2010. The series is written by Troy Duffy, produced by Innfusion Inc., and released through 12 Gauge Comics. The book focuses on a more in-depth version of Il Duce's back story, as well as telling the story of the brothers during a hit they performed that is not featured in the film. It was paired with a minibook that was featured on the official Boondock Saints website that told a ministory that takes place before the strip-club scene from the first film. These will eventually be released in one single graphic novel. The Boondock Saints: In Nomine Patris was written with J.B. Love and published in November 2011.

Video game 
A video game was supposed to be made based on the film, but was later cancelled.

References

External links

 
 
 
 
 Film School Rejects: 39 Things We Learned From The Boondock Saints' Commentary

1999 films
1990s buddy films
1999 independent films
1990s vigilante films
1999 action thriller films
1999 crime thriller films
1999 LGBT-related films
20th Century Fox films
American action thriller films
American crime thriller films
American independent films
American LGBT-related films
American vigilante films
Cross-dressing in American films
Films about father–son relationships
Fictional portrayals of the Boston Police Department
Films about Irish-American culture
Films about religion
Films about the American Mafia
Films about the Russian Mafia
Films about twin brothers
Films produced by Elie Samaha
Films scored by Jeff Danna
Films scored by Mychael Danna
Films set in Boston
Films shot in Boston
Films shot in Toronto
Franchise Pictures films
Gay-related films
LGBT-related thriller films
LGBT-related controversies in film
Saint Patrick's Day films
2000s English-language films
1990s English-language films
1990s American films
2000s American films